Counterstrike is a Canadian/French crime-fighting/espionage television series.  The series premiered on American cable channel USA Network on July 1, 1990. It ran for three seasons, airing 66 hour-long episodes in total.

Plot 
After his wife is kidnapped by terrorists, international industrialist Alexander Addington assembles a clandestine team of troubleshooters to help combat terrorism around the world.  He recruits Peter Sinclair from Scotland Yard to lead the team.  They set up a French con artist and art/jewelry thief named Nicole Beaumont and blackmail her into joining because of her valuable criminal connections.  The third teammember is Luke Brenner, an American mercenary whom they rescue from a Mexican jail.  The series' other recurring characters are Bennett and J.J., Alexander's valet and pilot, respectively.

In the second season's second episode Peter and Alexander encounter a French reporter named Gabrielle Germont whom they recruit into the team to prevent her from publishing a story about them.  In the season's third episode Peter and Gabrielle rescue Hector Stone, an American CIA-operative and former Navy SEAL whose cover has been blown, and invite him to join the team.

The character of Alexander's daughter Suzanne Addington, who designed the team's computer systems, was also written out of the series at the beginning of the second season.  Suzanne appears in one third season episode, although played by a different actress.  In her stead Alexander gets a secretary/confidante named Hélène Previn.

Cast 
 Christopher Plummer as Alexander Addington (1990–1993)
 Simon MacCorkindale as Peter Sinclair (1990–1993)
 Cyrielle Clair as Nicole Beaumont (1990–1991)
 Stephen Shellen as Luke Brenner (1990–1991)
 Laurence Ashley-Taboulet as Suzanne Addington (1990–1991)
 Sophie Michaud as Gabrielle Germont (1991–1993)
 James Purcell as Hector Stone (1991–1993)
 Patricia Cartier as Hélène Previn (1991–1993)
 Andre Mayers as J.J. (1990–1993)
 Tom Kneebone as Bennett (1990–1993)

Episodes

Season 1 (1990–91)

Season 2 (1991–92)

Season 3 (1992–93)

Awards and nominations
 1992 Gemini Award for Best Performance by an Actor in a Continuing Leading Dramatic Role (Simon MacCorkindale) – Nominated
 1992 Gemini Award for  Best Performance by an Actor in a Continuing Leading Dramatic Role (Christopher Plummer) – Nominated
 1994 Gemini Award for Best Performance by an Actress in a Continuing Leading Dramatic Role (Sophie Michaud) – Nominated
 1994 Gemini Award for Best Performance by an Actor in a Continuing Leading Dramatic Role (James Purcell) – WON

Broadcast
Counterstrike aired in the United States on cable channel USA Network, premiering on July 1, 1990. It premiered on November 2, 1991 on CTV in Canada, and on TF1 in France on November 20, 1991. Counterstrike has since aired in reruns in Canada on Showcase and TVtropolis.

References

External links
 
 

CTV Television Network original programming
Espionage television series
1990s Canadian drama television series
1990 Canadian television series debuts
1993 Canadian television series endings
Canadian Screen Award-winning television shows
USA Network original programming
French drama television series
Television shows filmed in Toronto
Television series by Alliance Atlantis